The 2011 Hart District council election took place on 5 May 2011, with one third of the seats up for election. The Conservatives, Liberal Democrats and Community Campaign (Hart) held all seats up for election, meaning that the council composition was the same after the election as it had been before.

Ward results

Blackwater and Hawley

Church Crookham West

Eversley

Fleet Courtmoor

Fleet North

Frogmore and Darby Green

Hartley Wintney

Hook

Odiham

Yateley East

Yateley North

Yateley West

References

Hart District Council elections
2011 English local elections
2010s in Hampshire